Robert Gibson (born Ruben Gibson, July 19, 1958) is an American professional wrestler. He is best known as one half of the tag team known as The Rock 'n' Roll Express, with Ricky Morton. He has competed in singles competition also, and has won various singles championships throughout his career. Gibson was inducted into the WWE Hall of Fame as a member of The Rock 'n' Roll Express, on March 31, 2017.

Professional wrestling career

Early career (1975–1983) 
Gibson started wrestling as Robert Gibson in 1977. His first match was against Eddie Sullivan. He was trained by his brother Ricky Gibson and teamed with him in the southern territories.

The Rock 'N Roll Express (1983–2003) 

In 1983, he formed the Rock 'N Roll Express with Ricky Morton. They feuded with The Midnight Express (Bobby Eaton and Dennis Condrey) in the CWA, several other territories, and, eventually, the feud carried over into the National Wrestling Alliance (NWA)'s Jim Crockett Promotions in 1985. They won the NWA Tag Title four times while there and feuded with the Four Horsemen, Ivan and Nikita Koloff, and the team of Rick Rude and Manny Fernandez. Even though he and Morton were of similar build and wrestled a similar style, Gibson was always booked as the stronger and more powerful of the two.

Gibson was injured in 1990 and when he returned to World Championship Wrestling (WCW) in 1991, Morton turned on him to join The York Foundation. They feuded and Gibson teamed with Tom Zenk, but had no success and soon left WCW. Wrestled briefly as a singles in Puerto Rico for the World Wrestling Council. He rejoined Morton in Smoky Mountain Wrestling (SMW) and they feuded with the Heavenly Bodies led by Jim Cornette. Shortly before SMW's demise, Gibson turned heel and joined "Cornette's Army". The team then had a run in the USWA, followed by stints in the WWF in 1993 and WCW in 1996. In 1998, they were part of the "NWA" angle in the World Wrestling Federation (WWF) for a brief period. The Rock n' Roll express were awarded the NWA tag team championships before losing them to The Headbangers a month later. In 1998, he went on his own to wrestle for Extreme Championship Wrestling. On February 12, 2000, he returned to WCW as he lost to WCW World Television Champion Jim Duggan on WCW Saturday Night. Their last run in a big federation was with Total Nonstop Action Wrestling when they were part of Vince Russo's Sports Entertainment Xtreme faction.

Later career (2002–present) 

He also appeared at one Wrestle Birmingham show in 2002 as "Robert Fuller Jr.", pretending to be the son of veteran wrestler Robert Fuller, a gimmick also used by other wrestlers. In late 2003/2004, Robert along with Ricky Morton, joined the newly formed "Original" Big Time Wrestling, under the banner of the All World Wrestling League. From 2007 to 2009, he worked for Ultimate Wrestling, a promotion in his home town of Pensacola, Florida, where he was one half of the first ever Ultimate Wrestling Tag-team Champions with Bobby Doll. In September 2010, he returned to Ultimate Wrestling. In 2014, The Rock-n-Roll Express was still wrestling on the independent circuit. In 2016, The Rock N' Roll Express made a special appearance as part of TNA's weekly televised program Impact Wrestlings Total Nonstop Deletion episode, where they took part in the Tag Team Apocalypto match along with other tag teams. In February 2017, WWE played a video package of the Rock n' Roll Express and the announcement of their hall of fame induction set for pre-WrestleMania. The Rock N Roll Express participated in the 2019 edition of the Jim Crockett Cup, but were defeated by The Briscoe Brothers in the first round. During the NWA television tapings on October 1, 2019, they won the NWA World Tag Team Championship. The team made their New Japan Pro Wrestling debut during the Fighting Spirit Unleashed 2019 event, 3 events promoted by NJPW in the United States.

Personal life
Gibson has acknowledged during a fundraising event at the Western Pennsylvania School for the Deaf that he is a hearing child of deaf parents. He knows sign language and often speaks with his hands in the ring before his matches. His brother Ricky Gibson died on September 15, 2006. Robert's mother and father are also deceased. The WWE acknowledged Ricky's death on WWE.com. Robert is engaged to Tami McMaster. He is part owner of Zeke's Deep Sea Fishing tours in Orange Beach, Alabama. In 2016, Gibson opened a wrestling school in Douglasville, Georgia, which also doubles as an independent wrestling promotion called All Pro Championship Wrestling.

Championships and accomplishmentsAppalachian Mountain WrestlingAMW Tag Team Championship (1 time)All-Pro Championship WrestlingAPCW Tag Team Championship (3 times) – with Jason Gibson and Mike Youngblood (2)All-Pro WrestlingAPW Heavyweight Championship (1 time)
APW Tag Team Championship (1 time)All-Star WrestlingASW Tag Team Championship (1 time) – with Ricky MortonCauliflower Alley ClubTag Team Award (2022) – with Ricky MortonJim Crockett PromotionsNWA World Tag Team Championship (Mid-Atlantic version) (4 times) – with Ricky MortonKorean Pro-Wrestling AssociationNWA World Tag Team Championship (1 time) – with Ricky MortonNWA Mid Atlantic Championship WrestlingMACW Tag Team Championship (4 times) - with Ricky Morton (3) and Brad Armstrong (1) Mid-South Wrestling Association (Tennessee)MSWA Southern Tag Team Championship (1 time) - with Ricky MortonMid-South Wrestling AssociationMid-South Tag Team Championship (3 times) – with Ricky MortonNational Wrestling AllianceNWA World Tag Team Championship (3 times) – with Ricky Morton1
NWA Hall of Fame (Class of 2006)NWA Hollywood WrestlingNWA Americas Tag Team Championship (1 time) – with Ricky GibsonNWA Mid-America / Continental Wrestling Association / Championship Wrestling AssociationAWA Southern Tag Team Championship (5 times) – with Ricky Gibson (3), Bill Dundee (1), and Ricky Morton (1)
CWA Tag Team Championship (1 time) – with Ricky Morton
CWA World Tag Team Championship (1 time) – with Ricky Morton
NWA Mid-America Heavyweight Championship (1 time)
NWA Mid-America Tag Team Championship (1 time) – with Don FargoNWA SouthwestNWA World Tag Team Championship (1 time) – with Ricky MortonNWA WildsideNWA Wildside Tag Team Championship (1 time) – with Ricky MortonNew Age Championship WrestlingNACW Tag Team Championship (1 time)Pro Wrestling eXpressPWX Tag Team Championship (1 time) – with Vince KaplackPro Wrestling IllustratedPWI ranked him #99 of the top 500 singles wrestlers of the "PWI Years" in 2003
PWI ranked him #4 of the Top 100 Tag Teams of the "PWI Years" with Ricky Morton in 2003.Professional Wrestling Hall of Fame and MuseumClass of 2021 - Inducted as a member of The Rock 'N' Roll ExpressSmoky Mountain WrestlingSMW Beat the Champ Television Championship (1 time)
SMW Tag Team Championship (4 times) – with Ricky MortonSoutheastern Championship WrestlingNWA Southeastern Tag Team Championship (1 time) – with Ricky Gibson
NWA Southeast United States Junior Heavyweight Championship (2 times)Traditional Championship WrestlingTCW Tag Team Championship (1 time) – with Ricky MortonUltimate Championship WrestlingUCW Tag Team Championship (1 time) - with Ricky MortonUltimate WrestlingUltimate Wrestling Tag Team Championship (1 time) - with Bobby DollUnited States Wrestling AssociationUSWA World Tag Team Championship (2 times) - with Ricky Morton	UPW Pro WrestlingUPW Tag Team Championship (1 time, current)Viral Pro WrestlingVPW Tag Team Championship (1 time) - with Ricky MortonWorld Organization of WrestlingWOW Tag Team Championship (1 time) – with Ricky MortonWrestling Observer NewsletterWrestling Observer Newsletter Hall of Fame (Class of 2014) – with Ricky MortonWWE'
 WWE Hall of Fame (Class of 2017 — with Ricky Morton)

1One of their reigns began in Memphis, Tennessee, though the records are unclear as to which promotion they were wrestling for. Another reign began with them being awarded the title, though it is not revealed where they were awarded nor which promotion they were wrestling for at the time.

References

External links

 Profile at CAGEMATCH.net
The Official Rock N' Roll Express web site Bookings, videos and pictures

1958 births
20th-century professional wrestlers
21st-century professional wrestlers
American male professional wrestlers
Living people
Professional wrestlers from Florida
Professional Wrestling Hall of Fame and Museum
Sportspeople from Pensacola, Florida
WWE Hall of Fame inductees
NWA World Tag Team Champions
SMW Beat the Champ Television Champions
NWA Americas Tag Team Champions
WCW World Tag Team Champions
NWA Georgia Tag Team Champions